CAAC Airlines, formerly the People's Aviation Company of China (中國人民航空公司), was the airline division of the Civil Aviation Administration of China (CAAC) and the monopoly civil airline in the People's Republic of China. It was founded on 17 July 1952, and merged into CAAC on 9 June 1953. In 1988, the monopoly was broken up and CAAC Airlines was split into six regional airlines, which later consolidated into China's Big Three airlines: Beijing-based Air China, Guangzhou-based China Southern Airlines, and Shanghai-based China Eastern Airlines.

In 1962, CAAC began operating international services, initially to other countries in the communist bloc such as the Soviet Union, Mongolia, North Korea, Laos, Burma, Bangladesh, North Vietnam, and Cambodia. By the mid-1980s, CAAC had long-haul service to the United States, Europe, the Middle East, and Australia, mainly using American Boeing aircraft, while continuing to use Soviet aircraft on routes to Eastern Europe.

Separation
In 1988, CAAC Airlines split into six separate airlines, each named after the geographic region of their main operating areas:

Air China, the flag carrier, based in Beijing, inherited the IATA and ICAO airline code of CAAC
China Southwest Airlines, based in Chengdu (merged into Air China in 2002)
China Eastern Airlines, based in Shanghai
China Northwest Airlines, based in Xi'an (merged into China Eastern in 2002)
China Southern Airlines, based in Guangzhou
China Northern Airlines, based in Shenyang (merged into China Southern in 2003)

CAAC used the IATA code CA on international flights only; domestic flights were not prefixed with the airline code.

CAAC's aircraft livery featured the Chinese national flag on the vertical stabilizer, with blue stripe cheatline and Chinese version of CAAC logo (designed by Lu Shifang in 1965, with the calligraphy of Premier Zhou Enlai) on a white fuselage. The most of the livery designs, especially the blue stripe cheatline, were also used by Air China.

Destinations

Fleet

CAAC Airlines consisted of the following aircraft:

Accidents and incidents
 On 5 April 1958, Ilyushin Il-14 632 crashed  from Xi'an while operating a Chengdu–Xi'an–Taiyuan–Beijing passenger flight, killing all 14 on board.
 On 26 September 1961, Shijiazhuang Y-5 18188 crashed into Qinglongshan (Blue Dragon Mountain), Henan Province, killing all 15 on board.
 On 15 February 1966, Shijiazhuang Y-5 18152 struck a mountain in Gansu Province in poor visibility; both pilots survived.
On 5 December 1968, Ilyushin Il-14 640 crashed 1209 meters south of Beijing Capital International Airport when landing, killing 10 people on board, including scientist Guo Yonghuai.
In 1969, Ilyushin Il-14 618 crashed at Guiyang.
On 14 November 1970, Ilyushin Il-14 616 struck a mountain near Guiyang, killing six.
In May 1972, a CAAC Lisunov Li-2 overshot the runway at Dalian Zhoushuizi Airport, killing six.
On 14 January 1973, Ilyushin Il-14 644 struck a mountain near Guiyang, killing all 29 on board.
On 21 January 1976, Antonov An-24 B-492 crashed on approach to Changsha Huanghua Airport, killing all 40 on board.
On 26 August 1976, a CAAC Ilyushin Il-14 crashed on landing at Chengdu, killing 12 passengers.
On 14 March 1979, Hawker Siddeley Trident 2E B-274 crashed into a factory in Beijing on climbout from Xijiao Airport during a training flight, killing all 12 on board and 180 on the ground.
On 20 March 1980, Antonov An-24RV B-484 crashed and burned near Changsha Huanghua Airport, killing all 26 on board.
On 26 April 1982, CAAC Flight 3303, a Hawker Siddeley Trident 2E (B-266), crashed into a mountain near Yangshuo while on approach to Guilin, killing all 112 on board.
On 25 July 1982, CAAC Flight 2505, an Ilyushin Il-18V (B-220), was hijacked en route from Xi'an to Shanghai. The co-pilot and navigator were wounded and a bomb exploded when passengers overpowered the hijackers. The aircraft landed at Shanghai with two engines flamed out.
On 24 December 1982, CAAC Flight 2311, an Ilyushin Il-18B (B-202), burst into flames while landing at Guangzhou Baiyun Airport, killing 25 of 69 on board.
On 5 May 1983, CAAC Flight 296, a Hawker Siddeley Trident 2E (B-296), was hijacked while en route from Shenyang Dongta Airport to Shanghai Hongqiao International Airport and landed at the US Army base Camp Page in South Korea. The incident marked the first direct negotiations between South Korea and China, which did not have formal relations at the time.
On 14 September 1983, CAAC Flight 264, a Hawker Siddeley Trident 2E B-264 collided with a Harbin H-5 bomber while taxiing at Guilin Qifengling Airport. 11 of 106 on board were killed.
On 25 June 1984, a CAAC aircraft was hijacked by a man armed with hand grenades and demanded to be flown to Taiwan. A passenger overpowered the hijacker and the aircraft continued to Fuzhou.
On 18 January 1985, CAAC Flight 5109, an Antonov An-24B (B-434), crashed in drizzle and fog while performing a missed approach to Jinan, killing 38 of 41 on board.
On 22 October 1985, Shorts 360-100 B-3606 was written off after overrunning the runway on landing at Enshi Airport; all 25 on board survived.
On 15 December 1986, Antonov An-24RV B-3413 crashed while attempting to return to Lanzhou after an engine failed due to icing, killing 6 of 44 on board.
On 16 June 1987, Boeing 737-2T4 B-2514 collided with a Shenyang J-6 at Fuzhou Airport; the J-6 crashed, killing the pilot while the 737 landed safely.
On 31 August 1988, CAAC Flight 301 (operated by China Southern Airlines), a Hawker Siddeley Trident 2E (B-2218), struck approach lights at Kai Tak Airport and struck a lip, collapsing the right main landing gear; the aircraft then slid off the runway into Kowloon Bay, killing 7 of the 89 on board. The cause was undetermined, but windshear may have been a factor.

See also
List of defunct airlines of China

References

Former monopolies
Companies based in Beijing
Defunct airlines of China
Transportation monopolies
Airlines established in 1949
Airlines disestablished in 1988
Government-owned companies of China
Civil Aviation Administration of China
Chinese companies established in 1949
Chinese companies disestablished in 1988